Gregorio is a masculine given name and a surname. It may refer to:

Given name
 Gregorio Aglipay (1860–1940), Filipino revolutionary and first supreme bishop of the Philippine Independent Church
 Gregorio Conrado Álvarez (1925–2016), Uruguayan army general and de facto President of Uruguay from 1981 until 1985
 Gregorio Álvarez (historian) (1889–1986), Argentine historian, physician and writer
 Gregorio S. Araneta (1869–1930), Filipino lawyer, businessman and nationalist
 Gregorio Benito (1946–2020), Spanish retired footballer
 Gregorio C. Brillantes, Filipino writer
 Gregorio di Cecco (c. 1390–after 1424), Italian painter
 Gregório Nunes Coronel (c. 1548–c. 1620), Portuguese theologian, writer and preacher
 Gregorio Cortez (1875–1916), Mexican-American tenant farmer and folk hero
 Gregorio De Gregori, printer in Renaissance Venice
 Gregorio del Pilar (1875–1899), Philippine Revolutionary Forces general during the Philippine Revolution and the Philippine–American War
 Gregorio De Ferrari (c. 1647–1726), Italian painter
 Gregorio López (writer) (1895–1966), Mexican novelist, poet and journalist
 Gregorio López (handballer) (1951–1987), Spanish handball player
 Gregorio López (jurist) (1496–1560), president of the Council of the Indies
 Gregorio López-Bravo y Castro (1923–1985), Spanish politician, Minister of Foreign Affairs between 1969 and 1973
 Gregorio Luperón (1839–1897), Dominican military and political leader, President of the Dominican Republic from 1879 to 1880
 Gregorio Marañón (1887–1960), Spanish physician, scientist, historian, writer and philosopher
 Gregório de Matos (1636–1696), colonial Brazilian poet
 Gregorio Pérez (born 1948), Uruguayan football manager and former player
 Gregorio Petit (born 1984), Major League Baseball player from Venezuela
 Gregorio Ricci-Curbastro (1853–1925), Italian mathematician, inventor of tensor calculus
 Gregorio Salvador Caja (1927-2020), Spanish linguist
 Gregorio Manuel Salvador (born 1981), Equatoguinean footballer

Surname
 John T. Gregorio (1928−2013), American politician
 Mateus Gregório (born 1993), Brazilian weightlifter
 Rose Gregorio (born 1934), American actress
 Rossella Gregorio (born 1990), Italian sabre fencer

See also
 De Gregorio, also DeGregorio, Di Gregorio and DiGregorio; some of these entries consider Gregorio to be the surname
 Gregory (given name)

Masculine given names
Italian masculine given names
Spanish masculine given names